Stefan Leletko (2 September 1953 in Świdnica – 9 October 2012 in Opole) was a Polish male weightlifter, who competed in the flyweight class and represented Poland at international competitions. He won the gold medal at the 1982 World Weightlifting Championships in the 52 kg category. He participated at the 1976 Summer Olympics and at the 1980 Summer Olympics in the 52 kg event.

References

External links
 

1953 births
Polish male weightlifters
World Weightlifting Championships medalists
People from Świdnica
Sportspeople from Lower Silesian Voivodeship
Olympic weightlifters of Poland
Weightlifters at the 1976 Summer Olympics
Weightlifters at the 1980 Summer Olympics
2012 deaths
20th-century Polish people
21st-century Polish people